Nataliya Trunova (born 20 January 1982) is a Kazakhstani ice hockey player. She competed in the women's tournament at the 2002 Winter Olympics.

References

1982 births
Living people
Kazakhstani women's ice hockey players
Olympic ice hockey players of Kazakhstan
Ice hockey players at the 2002 Winter Olympics
Sportspeople from Almaty
Asian Games gold medalists for Kazakhstan
Ice hockey players at the 2003 Asian Winter Games
Ice hockey players at the 2011 Asian Winter Games
Medalists at the 2003 Asian Winter Games
Medalists at the 2011 Asian Winter Games
Asian Games medalists in ice hockey